Sardasht or Sar-i-Dasht or Sar Dasht may refer to:
Sardasht, Lordegan, a city in Chaharmahal and Bakhtiari province, Iran
Sar Dasht, Fars, a village in Fars province, Iran
Sardasht, Hormozgan, a city in Hormozgan province, Iran
Saland, Iran, a city in Khuzestan province, Iran
Sardasht, Khuzestan, a city in Khuzestan province, Iran
Sardasht District, an administrative subdivision of Khuzestan province, Iran
Sar Dasht, Bagh-e Malek, a village in Khuzestan province, Iran
Sar Dasht, Kohgiluyeh, a village in Kohgiluyeh and Boyer-Ahmad province, Iran
Sar Dasht-e Abdolreza, a village in Kohgiluyeh and Boyer-Ahmad province, Iran
Sar Dasht-e Kalus, alternate name of Kalus-e Olya, a village in Kohgiluyeh and Boyer-Ahmad province, Iran
Sardasht-e Kalus, a village in Kohgiluyeh and Boyer-Ahmad Province, Iran
Sardasht, Kurdistan, a village in Kurdistan province, Iran
Sar Dasht, Lorestan, a village in Lorestan province, Iran
Sar Dasht, Razavi Khorasan, a village in Razavi Khorasan province, Iran
Sardasht, Sistan and Baluchestan, a village in Sistan and Baluchestan province, Iran
Sardasht-e Nematabad, a village in Sistan and Baluchestan province, Iran
Sardasht, West Azerbaijan, a city in West Azerbaijan province, Iran
Sardasht County, an administrative subdivision of West Azerbaijan province, Iran
Sardasht Rural District (disambiguation), administrative subdivisions of Iran